Life Unexpected is  an American teen drama television series that aired for two seasons from January 18, 2010 to January 18, 2011. It was produced by Best Day Ever Productions and Mojo Films in association with CBS Productions and Warner Bros. Television and broadcast by The CW. Created by Liz Tigelaar, who served as an executive producer with Gary Fleder and Janet Leahy, the series stars Britt Robertson, Shiri Appleby, Kristoffer Polaha, and Kerr Smith.

Set in Portland, the story follows Lux Cassidy, a teenager who was given up at birth and has spent her life in foster care who finds her biological parents, Nate Bazile and Cate Cassidy. Wishing to become emancipated, Lux is instead given in to their custody.

While Life Unexpected received mostly positive reviews, it struggled in the ratings and was canceled by The CW in 2011.

Plot
Lux Cassidy (Britt Robertson) has been through the foster care system for almost her whole life. Cate Cassidy (Shiri Appleby) gave birth to her at 16 but gave her up for adoption after Social Services promised her that the baby would be adopted quickly. But the baby had heart problems (ventricular septal defect) and needed countless surgeries, so she was not a desirable candidate for adoption and ended up in the foster-care system and group homes.

Just before her 16th birthday, Lux petitions a court to become an emancipated minor, but she learns that she must get signatures from her unknown birth parents. She locates her father, Nate Bazile (Kristoffer Polaha), who operates the Open Bar inside a building his father gave him. "Baze" lives like an overgrown frat boy above the bar with two roommates: his childhood best friend Math (Austin Basis), a high-school teacher; and Jamie (Reggie Austin), who also works at the bar. However, even when he signs the papers, Baze discovers that he is already bonding with his newfound daughter, and realizes that she has his eyes.

Baze introduces Lux to her mother Cate Cassidy, co-host of the "Morning Madness" drive time show at Portland radio station K-100 and Baze's former one-night stand from high school. Lux has been listening to Cate's voice on the radio for as long as she can remember, so she feels an instant connection to the mom she's never met. Baze takes Lux to meet Cate, who is shocked and saddened to learn that Lux has grown up in foster care instead of the real adoptive home she had been promised her baby would have, and she's reluctant to commit to her daughter. Eventually Cate wants to be a part of Lux's life, and she shows that she really does care.

When a judge decides that Lux isn't ready for emancipation and unexpectedly grants temporary joint custody to Baze and Cate, they agree to try to get past the awkwardness. Because of her radio-host job and suitable house, Cate is given primary custody of Lux. Ryan Thomas (Kerr Smith), her radio-broadcast partner and fiancé, also bonds with Lux and is sometimes better able to reach her than her parents, because he's faced issues similar to hers.

As the series progresses, Baze becomes more responsible and works harder to get the bar and the loft apartment in shape so it's fit for Lux to stay with him sometimes; eventually he sets aside a corner of the loft for her bedroom. Their close bond is causing slacker-esque Baze to prove that he can come through for Lux and provide support and love. As for Cate, she constantly disappoints Lux, but she does mean well, and Alice (Erin Karpluk), producer of her radio show, often serves as her much-needed confidante.

Ryan breaks up with Cate, but eventually they reconcile and the engagement is back on. He also relents a bit towards Baze after the two have drinks and Baze explains that all he is to Cate is Lux's father. But by the series' send, Baze and Ryan are good friends.

Baze's bar is owned by his father Jack (Robin Thomas), who considers Baze a disappointment, but softens towards him somewhat in later episodes, due to Lux's entrance in their lives. Baze himself later buys the bar. Also seen is Cate's four-times-divorced mother, who had convinced Cate to give up Lux; and Baze's level-headed, understanding mother Ellen (Susan Hogan). Both love Lux when they meet her, though Ellen seems to have the stronger grandmotherly bond with her.

Lux had been attending Longfellow High, a rough high school in Portland, but Cate enrolls her at Westmonte High, the alma mater of herself, Baze, and Math, and the institution at which Math currently teaches. At first infuriated, Lux soon adapts and makes friends, among them popular Jones Mager (Austin Butler) who is the quarterback like her father was. Meanwhile, she wonders how friends from her old life might fit into her new one. Tasha Siviac has been her best friend since she was seven (they met at Sunnyvale, the foster-care home), and Lux hopes to stay in touch with her, her boyfriend Gavin, and Lux's own first boyfriend Bug, who has been in trouble with the law; this might imperil Lux's new life with Baze and Cate. Lux's longtime social worker Fern Redmund is instrumental in helping Cate and Baze get their parental rights reinstated and helping the three become an official family. Fern thus becomes a family friend.

At various times Baze incurs Cate's wrath by sleeping with Cate's younger sister, Lux's Aunt Abby, a neurotic therapist and yoga practitioner. Baze also sleeps with Ryan's sister Paige after a drunk incident in season two.

Lux meets a young man, Eric Daniels, at Baze's bar; after she goes on a date with him she discovers that he is her new teacher. The second season deals with this affair, which ends when Eric leaves town when Cate and Baze threaten to call the police if he doesn't resign his job and leave Portland; Cate and Ryan's new marriage and attempts to conceive; and Baze's relationship with coworker Emma Bradshaw who has a son, Sam. Later Tasha becomes more a part of the family's life after she strikes out on her own. Bug and Gavin disappear, Bug having left town after Lux rejected his marriage proposal.

Cate miscarried her child with Ryan because of a condition she developed after having Lux. Lux being the only child she would ever have created a stronger bond between mother and daughter, and Lux finally realizes that she has a real mom who loves her and won't let anything or anyone harm her. After nearly giving in to desire, Baze breaks up with Emma after learning from Lux that Emma had had an affair with his dad. It didn't happen when Baze was going out with her, but it meant his dad cheating on his mother, and he decided that he could never be with Emma without thinking of his father.

The show then fast-forwards two years to Lux delivering the commencement speech at her graduation. It is revealed that Ryan and Julia are together and have a young son from their affair, and that Baze and Cate are finally together as a couple. Math and Alice are married and expecting. Jones also kisses Lux, revealing that they end up together, and Tasha is seen happy for them. At the end, the family and friends take a photo together.

Cast
Britt Robertson as Lux Cassidy
Megan Charpentier as Young Little Lux Cassidy
Shiri Appleby as Cate Cassidy
Kristoffer Polaha as Nathaniel "Baze" Bazile
Kerr Smith as Ryan Thomas
Austin Basis as Matthew "Math" Rogers
Ksenia Solo as Natasha "Tash" Siviac
Emma Caulfield as Emma Bradshaw 
Arielle Kebbel as Paige 
Austin Butler as Jones Mager
Lucia Walters as Fern Redmund
Erin Karpluk as Alice 
Rafi Gavron as Bobby "Bug" Guthrie
Shaun Sipos as Eric Daniels
Landon Liboiron as Sam
Reggie Austin as Jamie
Alexandra Breckenridge as Abby Cassidy

Background
Creator Liz Tigelaar came up with the idea for the show in 2007 and developed it with director Gary Fleder. Tigelaar and Fleder pitched the show, then titled Light Years, to ABC Studios who accepted it, selling the show to The CW. In September 2008 The CW ordered the show to pilot. After the pilot was ordered, ABC dropped the show for financial reasons. The show was picked up by CBS Television Studios. The pilot was filmed in January 2009, written by Tigelaar and directed by Fleder. Both served as executive producers.

The CW announced the series in January 2009 under the working title of Light Years because the main character Lux's name means Light. According to Tigelaar, the title "tested way too sci-fi" and it was changed to LUX in April. Soon changed again into Life Unexpected, the series was promoted at the CW Upfronts in May as Parental Discretion Advised. That June, the network reverted to the name Life UneXpected, highlighting the name of the main character in capital letters. Initial advertising for the series in fall 2009 listed it without the capitalized "X", which became the final version.

Production
While the show is set in Portland, Oregon, most of the filming was done in Vancouver, British Columbia. Many external scenes were filmed in Portland, including the many bridges, MAX Lightrail, China Town Arch, Portland's Amtrak Union Station, and other Portland locations. Scenes of Westmonte High were filmed at Sutherland Secondary School in North Vancouver and H. J. Cambie Secondary School in Richmond, British Columbia. The exterior of Baze's bar is located on Granville Island and the Ironworks Building in Vancouver. North Shore Studios, formally Lionsgate, was used as the primary studio for season one while Coast Mountain Film Studios housed the show for the second and final season.

The show premiered on The CW on Monday, January 18, 2010. The 13-episode first season run ended on April 12, 2010. The series was picked up for a second season for an initial thirteen episode order, which premiered on September 14, 2010 airing on Tuesdays at 9/8c (following One Tree Hill).

In October 2010, The CW ordered two additional scripts. In November 2010 The CW declined to order the back 9 episodes for the show's second and final season, leaving the season's episode count at 13. Members of the cast campaigned to save the show. On December 6, 2010 series creator, Liz Tigelaar made the TV show's cancellation official via Twitter.

One Tree Hill crossover
In an attempt to improve Life Unexpected'''s ratings by attracting One Tree Hill viewers, The CW aired a crossover event involving both programs on October 12, 2010. Beginning with One Tree Hill installment "Nobody Taught Us to Quit", Haley James Scott (Bethany Joy Lenz) and Mia Catalano (Kate Voegele) traveled to Portland (where Life Unexpected is set) to perform at the Sugar Magnolia Music Festival hosted by K-100. Haley and Cate meet in the crossover and are "surprised to learn that they share a similar back story [as] mothers." "Music Faced," the Life Unexpected episode of the crossover, also featured Sarah McLachlan, Ben Lee and Rain Perry whose song "Beautiful Tree" serves as the series' opening theme.

Series overview

 Episodes 
 Season 1 (2010) 

 Season 2 (2010–11) 
The series was renewed by The CW for a second season on May 20, 2010. It was also moved to Tuesday nights at 9:00 p.m.

Reception

Critical response
The first season of Life Unexpected scored a 69 out of 100 on Metacritic. The series has garnered mostly positive feedback, with many reviews favorably comparing the show to the critically acclaimed series Gilmore Girls and Everwood. Maureen Ryan, from the Chicago Tribune, stated that the show "recall[s] the good things about shows like Gilmore Girls and Everwood," and similarly, Hank Stuever from The Washington Post called it "a pleasant mix of a little Juno hipitude and a lot of Everwood glow." Furthermore, the Chicago Tribune review called Life Unexpected a program "that parents and their older kids could enjoy together without feeling condescended to," and The Boston Globes Matthew Gilbert states that "the show works, in its own hokey, feel-good, alt-soundtrack way."

Show writer Liz Tigelaar (who has also worked on Brothers & Sisters, American Dreams, and Once and Again), has received much praise. A review in the Los Angeles Times called Tigelaar's writing smart and insightful. Similarly, Randee Dawn, from The Hollywood Reporter stated that Tigelaar "has a delicate, spot-on feel for dialogue." The Futon Critic'''s Brian Ford Sullivan singled out writer Liz Tigelaar and director Gary Fleder for adeptly exploring Lux's perceived lack of love in her life.

On a negative note, a review in the Chicago Sun Times by Paige Wiser called the show "somewhat predictable" and The Posts Stuever adds that Life Unexpected "burns off its most interesting plot twist [...] in the first 20 minutes."

Ratings

Accolades
Life Unexpected was nominated for "Choice TV Breakout Show" at the 2010 Teen Choice Awards.

Broadcast 
In Canada the show premiered on the free-to-air channel CBC Television and on the pay TV channel YTV Canada. In Europe the show premiered on E4 for the United Kingdom from September 19, 2010, on Sixx for Germany from January 4, 2011, and on RTÉ Two for Ireland from August 2011. In Oceania the show premiered on MediaWorks' C4 for New Zealand from October 2010 and on Network Ten for Australia from November 5, 2011. In India the show premiered on Big CBS Prime from February 2013.

Home media releases
The two seasons were released together on DVD in Region 1 on April 5, 2011. It was later released in Region 4 in 2012.

References

External links 

2010s American teen drama television series
2010 American television series debuts
2011 American television series endings
The CW original programming
English-language television shows
Television series about shared parenting
Television series about teenagers
Television series by CBS Studios
Television series by Warner Bros. Television Studios
Television shows filmed in Vancouver
Television shows set in Portland, Oregon